Nélson Ricardo Gomes Alves Santos (born ), known as Ré, is a Portuguese futsal player who plays as a winger for Leões Porto Salvo Ré was capped 29 times for the Portugal national team and competed in the 2016 FIFA Futsal World Cup.

References

External links

Ré at playmakerstats.com (formerly thefinalball.com)

1985 births
Living people
Portuguese men's futsal players
Sporting CP futsal players
S.L. Benfica futsal players